Pultenaea ochreata is a species of flowering plant in the family Fabaceae and is endemic to the south-west of Western Australia. It is an erect shrub with egg-shaped leaves with the narrower end towards the base and yellow-orange flowers with red or brown marks.

Description
The flowers are yellow-orange with red or brown marks, and sessile. Flowering occurs from July to October and the fruit is a flattened pod.

Taxonomy and naming
Pultenaea ochreata was first formally described in 1844 by Carl Meissner in Lehmann's Plantae Preissianae. The specific epithet (ochreata) means "having a sheath" of stipules.

Distribution and habitat
This pultenaea grows in sandy soil in winter-west places in the Jarrah Forest, Swan Coastal Plain and Warren biogeographic regions of south-western Western Australia.

Conservation status
Pultenaea ochreata is classified as "not threatened" by the Government of Western Australia Department of Parks and Wildlife.

References

ochreata
Eudicots of Western Australia
Plants described in 1844
Taxa named by Carl Meissner